Churen Himal is a mountain part of the Dhaulagiri massif.

It was first climbed by Kozo Hasegawa, and Ang Norbu Sherpa in 1970.

References

External links 

 Churen Himal at Nepal Himal Peak Profile

Seven-thousanders of the Himalayas
Mountains of the Gandaki Province